Saad Agouzoul (born 10 August 1997) is a Moroccan professional footballer who plays as a defender for Ligue 2 club Sochaux.

Club career
A youth product of Kawkab Marrakech, Agouzoul debuted with the first team in 2017.

On 11 July 2019, Agouzoul signed a professional contract with Ligue 1 side Lille for five years.

On 1 July 2022, Agouzoul joined Sochaux on a three-year deal.

International career
Agouzoul was called up to a pair of 2019 Africa U-23 Cup of Nations qualification matches for the Morocco U23s in March 2019.

References

External links
 
 

1997 births
Living people
Sportspeople from Marrakesh
Moroccan footballers
Morocco youth international footballers
Association football defenders
Lille OSC players
Royal Excel Mouscron players
FC Sochaux-Montbéliard players
Belgian Pro League players
Botola players
Ligue 2 players
Championnat National 2 players
Moroccan expatriate footballers
Moroccan expatriate sportspeople in France
Expatriate footballers in France
Moroccan expatriate sportspeople in Belgium
Expatriate footballers in Belgium